Mont baung is a traditional Burmese snack or mont.

This snack is a molded rice cake that is typically filled with coconut shavings or red bean cooked in jaggery, and then steamed in a traditional clay pot. It bears a resemblance to the Malaysian and Singaporean putu piring or kuih tutu, though It is comparably larger in size.

Sagaing holds an annual mont baung festival, during the full moon day of Nadaw, at the Weluwun Ngahtatgyi temple precincts (ဝေဠုဝန်ငါးထပ်ကြီးဘုရား).

References

Burmese cuisine
Dumplings
Foods containing coconut
Steamed foods
Burmese desserts and snacks